The meridian 122° east of Greenwich is a line of longitude that extends from the North Pole across the Arctic Ocean, Asia, the Pacific Ocean, the Indian Ocean, Australia, the Southern Ocean, and Antarctica to the South Pole.

The 122nd meridian east forms a great circle with the 58th meridian west.

From Pole to Pole
Starting at the North Pole and heading south to the South Pole, the 122nd meridian east passes through:

{| class="wikitable plainrowheaders"
! scope="col" width="130" | Co-ordinates
! scope="col" | Country, territory or sea
! scope="col" | Notes
|-
| style="background:#b0e0e6;" | 
! scope="row" style="background:#b0e0e6;" | Arctic Ocean
| style="background:#b0e0e6;" |
|-
| style="background:#b0e0e6;" | 
! scope="row" style="background:#b0e0e6;" | Laptev Sea
| style="background:#b0e0e6;" |
|-valign="top"
| 
! scope="row" | 
| Sakha Republic Amur Oblast — from  Zabaykalsky Krai — for about 3 km from  Amur Oblast — from  Zabaykalsky Krai — from  Amur Oblast — from  Zabaykalsky Krai — from 
|-valign="top"
| 
! scope="row" | 
| Heilongjiang Inner Mongolia —  Jilin —  Inner Mongolia —  Liaoning — 
|-
| style="background:#b0e0e6;" | 
! scope="row" style="background:#b0e0e6;" | Yellow Sea
| style="background:#b0e0e6;" | Liaodong Bay
|-valign="top"
| 
! scope="row" | 
| Liaoning — Liaodong Peninsula
|-
| style="background:#b0e0e6;" | 
! scope="row" style="background:#b0e0e6;" | Yellow Sea
| style="background:#b0e0e6;" |
|-valign="top"
| 
! scope="row" | 
| Shandong — Shandong Peninsula
|-
| style="background:#b0e0e6;" | 
! scope="row" style="background:#b0e0e6;" | Yellow Sea
| style="background:#b0e0e6;" |
|-
| style="background:#b0e0e6;" | 
! scope="row" style="background:#b0e0e6;" | East China Sea
| style="background:#b0e0e6;" |
|-valign="top"
| 
! scope="row" | 
| Shanghai — Jiuduansha (intertidal)
|-valign="top"
| style="background:#b0e0e6;" | 
! scope="row" style="background:#b0e0e6;" | East China Sea
| style="background:#b0e0e6;" | Passing through the Donghai Bridge (at )
|-valign="top"
| 
! scope="row" | 
| Zhejiang — Zhoushan Island, mainland, and minor islands
|-
| style="background:#b0e0e6;" | 
! scope="row" style="background:#b0e0e6;" | East China Sea
| style="background:#b0e0e6;" |
|-valign="top"
| 
! scope="row" | 
| Easternmost point of the island of Taiwan — claimed by 
|-
| style="background:#b0e0e6;" | 
! scope="row" style="background:#b0e0e6;" | East China Sea
| style="background:#b0e0e6;" |
|-valign="top"
| style="background:#b0e0e6;" | 
! scope="row" style="background:#b0e0e6;" | Pacific Ocean
| style="background:#b0e0e6;" | Philippine Sea — passing just east of islands in the Batanes group,  (at )
|-
| 
! scope="row" | 
| Batan Island
|-valign="top"
| style="background:#b0e0e6;" | 
! scope="row" style="background:#b0e0e6;" | Pacific Ocean
| style="background:#b0e0e6;" | Philippine Sea — passing just east of the Babuyan Islands,  (at )
|-
| 
! scope="row" | 
| Island of Luzon
|-
| style="background:#b0e0e6;" | 
! scope="row" style="background:#b0e0e6;" | Pacific Ocean
| style="background:#b0e0e6;" | Philippine Sea
|-
| 
! scope="row" | 
| Island of Polillo
|-
| style="background:#b0e0e6;" | 
! scope="row" style="background:#b0e0e6;" | Lamon Bay
| style="background:#b0e0e6;" |
|-
| 
! scope="row" | 
| Islands of Alabat and Luzon
|-
| style="background:#b0e0e6;" | 
! scope="row" style="background:#b0e0e6;" | Tayabas Bay
| style="background:#b0e0e6;" |
|-
| 
! scope="row" | 
| Island of Marinduque
|-valign="top"
| style="background:#b0e0e6;" | 
! scope="row" style="background:#b0e0e6;" | Tablas Strait
| style="background:#b0e0e6;" | Passing just west of the island of Banton,  (at ) Passing just west of the island of Simara,  (at )
|-
| 
! scope="row" | 
| Island of Tablas
|-
| style="background:#b0e0e6;" | 
! scope="row" style="background:#b0e0e6;" | Sibuyan Sea
| style="background:#b0e0e6;" |
|-
| 
! scope="row" | 
| Island of Panay
|-
| style="background:#b0e0e6;" | 
! scope="row" style="background:#b0e0e6;" | Sulu Sea
| style="background:#b0e0e6;" |
|-
| 
! scope="row" | 
| Island of Panay
|-
| style="background:#b0e0e6;" | 
! scope="row" style="background:#b0e0e6;" | Sulu Sea
| style="background:#b0e0e6;" |
|-
| 
! scope="row" | 
| Island of Mindanao
|-
| style="background:#b0e0e6;" | 
! scope="row" style="background:#b0e0e6;" | Basilan Strait
| style="background:#b0e0e6;" |
|-
| 
! scope="row" | 
| Island of Basilan and the Tapiantana Islands
|-
| style="background:#b0e0e6;" | 
! scope="row" style="background:#b0e0e6;" | Celebes Sea
| style="background:#b0e0e6;" |
|-
| 
! scope="row" | 
| Island of Sulawesi (Minahassa Peninsula)
|-
| style="background:#b0e0e6;" | 
! scope="row" style="background:#b0e0e6;" | Gulf of Tomini
| style="background:#b0e0e6;" |
|-
| 
! scope="row" | 
| Togian Islands
|-
| style="background:#b0e0e6;" | 
! scope="row" style="background:#b0e0e6;" | Gulf of Tomini
| style="background:#b0e0e6;" |
|-
| 
! scope="row" | 
| Island of Sulawesi (East Peninsula)
|-
| style="background:#b0e0e6;" | 
! scope="row" style="background:#b0e0e6;" | Banda Sea
| style="background:#b0e0e6;" |
|-
| 
! scope="row" | 
| Island of Sulawesi (South-East Peninsula
|-
| style="background:#b0e0e6;" | 
! scope="row" style="background:#b0e0e6;" | Banda Sea
| style="background:#b0e0e6;" |
|-
| 
! scope="row" | 
| Island of Kabaena
|-valign="top"
| style="background:#b0e0e6;" | 
! scope="row" style="background:#b0e0e6;" | Banda Sea
| style="background:#b0e0e6;" | Passing just east of the Selayar Islands,  (at )
|-
| style="background:#b0e0e6;" | 
! scope="row" style="background:#b0e0e6;" | Flores Sea
| style="background:#b0e0e6;" |
|-
| 
! scope="row" | 
| Island of Flores
|-
| style="background:#b0e0e6;" | 
! scope="row" style="background:#b0e0e6;" | Savu Sea
| style="background:#b0e0e6;" |
|-
| 
! scope="row" | 
| Island of Savu
|-
| style="background:#b0e0e6;" | 
! scope="row" style="background:#b0e0e6;" | Indian Ocean
| style="background:#b0e0e6;" |
|-
| 
! scope="row" | 
| Western Australia — Seringapatam Reef
|-valign="top"
| style="background:#b0e0e6;" | 
! scope="row" style="background:#b0e0e6;" | Indian Ocean
| style="background:#b0e0e6;" | Passing just east of Scott Reef, Western Australia,  (at )
|-
| 
! scope="row" | 
| Western Australia — mainland and the Archipelago of the Recherche
|-
| style="background:#b0e0e6;" | 
! scope="row" style="background:#b0e0e6;" | Indian Ocean
| style="background:#b0e0e6;" | Australian authorities consider this to be part of the Southern Ocean
|-
| style="background:#b0e0e6;" | 
! scope="row" style="background:#b0e0e6;" | Southern Ocean
| style="background:#b0e0e6;" |
|-
| 
! scope="row" | Antarctica
| Australian Antarctic Territory, claimed by 
|-
|}

See also
121st meridian east
123rd meridian east

References

e122 meridian east